Gustaf de Frumerie (10 April 1872 – 21 December 1947) was a Swedish architect.

Biography
Gustaf de Frumerie graduated in 1890 and received his education as an architect at the Royal Institute of Technology in Stockholm in 1895.

As an architect at the gas and electricity plants, Gustaf de Frumerie worked under fellow Swedish architect Ferdinand Boberg, who was hired by the city to design the new large technical facilities for gas and electricity production, which were built around the turn of the 20th century. Gustaf de Frumerie became known thanks to the building of some large office and industrial facilities for Stockholm's gas, electricity and waterworks, where the chief architect was Boberg, whom he later succeeded in this capacity.

The building was inaugurated in 1906. Today,  has its premises there.

The facility is characterized by powerful building volumes and design with classicist form elements.

Gustaf de Frumerie also designed poles for arc lamps at Norrbro and Norrmalmstorg. Norrmalmstorg's golden Art Nouveau-inspired luminaires on high poles were erected in 1911 and taken down in connection with a rebuilding in 1967 for right-hand traffic. In 1994, they were put back into place. They were, in fact, copies made after Frumerie's preserved drawings, as the original luminaires were lost. In the 1920s, he developed the prototype into a lamppost with a curved upper part.

Gallery

References

Sources
 Björn Hallerdt (redaktör) (1992). Stockholms tekniska historia, del V. Ljus kraft värma. Stockholm monographs. ISBN 91-7031-035-1
 Stahre, Nils-Gustaf; Fogelström, Per Anders (1986). Stockholms gatunamn: innerstaden. Monographs published by the City of Stockholm. Stockholm: Liber/Allmänna förlaget. ISBN 91-38-90777-1
 Andersson, Henrik O.; Bedoire, Fredric (1977) [1973]. Stockholms byggnader: en bok om arkitektur och stadsbild i Stockholm (3). Stockholm: Prisma. ISBN 91-518-1125-1

1872 births
1947 deaths
19th-century Swedish architects
20th-century Swedish architects
Swedish people of Walloon descent
Gustaf